Jasper High School (JHS, formerly Walker High School) is a public high school in Jasper, Alabama, United States. It is part of the Jasper City Schools district.

On June 20, 2016, the Jasper City Board of Education voted to rename the school to its current name, which came into effect in the 2017–2018 academic year. Then what was Maddox Middle School merged with the High School and became Jasper Junior High School.

Football team 
 Region Champions - 1976, 1977, 1980, 1997, 1998, 1999, 2012, 2018
 Overall record - 575-358-35
 Seasons- 97
 Winning seasons - 73 (#2)
 Longest winning streak - 17 (11/16/1929 - 12/2/1931)
As of 2020, the head coach of the football team is Philip Bailey, formerly the team's offensive line strength and conditioning coach.  The football stadium is named Ki-Ro/Gambrell field, after former head coach Joe Gambrell, who coached the Vikings from 1952 to 1966. The stadium is used for Varsity, Junior Varsity, and Junior High, football games.

Notable alumni 
 Bruce Jones, football player, Green Bay Packers, 1927-1934
 George Lindsey (1928-2012), actor
 Slick Lollar, football player, Green Bay Packers, 1938
 Claude Perry, football player, Green Bay Packers, 1927-1935
 Leigh Sherer, Miss Alabama 1993

References

External links 
 

Public high schools in Alabama
Schools in Walker County, Alabama